Aporia crataegi, the black-veined white, is a large butterfly of the family Pieridae.
A. crataegi is widespread and common. In the south, it is found in Turkey, Cyprus, Israel, Lebanon and Syria. It is not present in the British Isles and northern Scandinavia.

Subspecies
Subspecies include:
 Aporia crataegi adherbal (Fruhstorfer, 1910) Japan
 Aporia crataegi augusta (Turati, 1905) Sicily
 Aporia crataegi augustior (Graves, 1925) Jordan, Israel
 Aporia crataegi banghaasi (Bryk, 1921)
 Aporia crataegi basania (Fruhstorfer, 1910) Alps
 Aporia crataegi colona (Krulikowsky, 1909) Russia
 Aporia crataegi crataegi (Linnaeus, 1758) Scandinavia
 Aporia crataegi fert (Turati & Fiori, 1930) Greece
 Aporia crataegi hyalina (Röber, 1907) Asia Minor
 Aporia crataegi iranica (Forster, 1939) Armenia, Iran, Azerbaijan
 Aporia crataegi karavaievi (Krulikowsky, 1926) Russia, Ukraine, Balkans
 Aporia crataegi mauretanica (Obethür, 1909) Northern Africa
 Aporia crataegi meinhardi (Krulikowsky, 1909) Siberia, Kamchatka Peninsula
 Aporia crataegi pellucida (Ruber, 1907) Kopet-Dagh
 Aporia crataegi rotunda (Eitschberger, 1971) Italy
 Aporia crataegi rutae (Bryk, 1940) Spain
 Aporia crataegi sachalinensis (Matsumura, 1925) Sakhalin
 Aporia crataegi shugnana (Sheljuzhko, 1925) Pamir
 Aporia crataegi tianschanica (Rühl, 1893)
 Aporia crataegi transitoria (Lempke, 1974) Central Europe

Distribution and habitat
It occurs in open forest, grazing land, orchards. lanes, gardens, meadows and thickets throughout most of Europe, temperate Asia, Korea, and Japan. This species is extinct in the British Isles.

Description
Females are commonly larger than males. The upperside of both forewings and hindwings is a translucent white boldly veined with black. The underside is similar in the male but the female has brown veining. Moreover, the female loses most of her scales by rubbing her wings together, resulting almost-transparent.

This butterfly can be distinguished from other members of white butterflies of the genus Pieris by its distinctive veined wings.

The eggs are yellow at first, darkening with age. The caterpillars are greenish grey with transverse banding. The pupa is creamy white, marked with black, attached by a silken girdle to a twig.

Biology
The flight period of the black-veined white is between April and July. The adults are quite social and their abundance varies greatly from year to year. The eggs are laid on the food plant, usually a member of the rose family Rosaceae and often on trees and bushes (Malus domestica, Malus micromalus, Pyrus communis, Pyrus serotina, Sorbus intermedia, Sorbus hybrida, Sorbus aucuparia, Crataegus monogyna, Crataegus oxyacantha, Crataegus jozana, Prunus spinosa, Prunus padus, Prunus ssiori, Betula spp., Salix phylicifolia, Chaenomeles lagenaria).

The eggs are laid in groups of 30 to 100. They take about three weeks to hatch. The caterpillars tend to remain in a group with a communal larval web. This species has one generation each year. The caterpillars overwinter communally in a webbing tent with entwined leaves. Caterpillars feed close together on the leaves of the food plant at first, before dispersing in the later developmental stages to other parts of the tree.

The pupal stage lasts about three weeks.

References

External links
 Lepiforum.de
 Moths and Butterflies of Europe and North Africa by Paolo Mazzei, Daniel Morel, Raniero Panfili
 Pyrgus.de

Aporia (butterfly)
Butterflies of Asia
Butterflies of Europe
Butterflies of Japan
Butterflies described in 1758
Taxa named by Carl Linnaeus